Gullible's Travels is the sixth studio album by Rehab, released in February 2012. It was released on the indie label AVJ Records, a subsidiary of Average Joes Entertainment.

Track listing

References

External links

2012 albums
Rehab (band) albums